Heroine's Quest: The Herald of Ragnarok is an adventure game/RPG hybrid developed by Dutch studio Crystal Shard, set in the world of the Poetic Edda and Norse Mythology.

Plot
The city of Fornsigtuna is wrapped in an endless winter. Egther, the last of the frost giants on Midgard, is causing this in an effort to start Ragnarok, the end of the world in Norse myth. The jarl of Fornsigtuna has called for a hero to save the city, to which the player character responds. Barely surviving an initial attack by Thrivaldi, Egther's right-hand troll, the heroine travels between Fornsigtuna, the village of Munarvagr, and the otherworldy Svartalfheim. The troll is using strong-arm tactics to try to obtain the eyes of Thiassi, which would allow him to unleash Egther on the world. The heroine first foils these attempts, then has to gain the trust of the villagers to obtain the eyes for herself. Using these, she confronts Thrivaldi and Egther in a showdown at the frost giant's frozen castle of Gastropnir.

Reception
Rock, Paper, Shotgun described it as a "beautiful game about selfless, old-fashioned heroism that brilliantly captures the spirit of Quest for Glory", PC Gamer claimed it "goes above and beyond most free adventure games/RPGs by offering "over 100 hand-painted backgrounds", voice acting, a neat auto-mapping function, along with optional sidequests and multiple ways to approach many quests", while Kotaku labelled it "about as perfect a tribute to Sierra's classic Quest for Glory series [...] as you could hope for".

RPG Codex ranks it in the Top 70 RPGs of all times.

References

External links
 
Reviews on Steam
Review on RockPaperShotgun
Review on Gamezebo
Review on Mobygames
Review on Hardcoregamer.com

Adventure Game Studio games
2014 video games
Adventure games
AGS Award winners
Linux games
Video games developed in the Netherlands
Video games featuring female protagonists
Windows games